Chat Trakan may refer to:
 Chat Trakan District
 Chat Trakan Subdistrict